Rare Diamonds is a compilation album, containing songs of the German heavy metal band Warlock and songs coming from Warlock singer Doro Pesch's first two solo albums. The album was released as LP in 1991 at the same time of a VHS with videos of the band and Doro's.

Track listing

VHS track listing
"Rare Diamond" – 3:23
"Unholy Love" – 2:39
"A Whiter Shade of Pale" – 2:56
"Hard Times" – 3:25 
"Für Immer" – 4:52 
"All We Are" – 3:19 
"Fight for Rock" – 3:28

References

External links
 Doro American site

Warlock (band) albums
Doro (musician) compilation albums
1991 compilation albums
Vertigo Records compilation albums
Split albums
Doro (musician) video albums
1991 video albums
PolyGram video albums